The 1975 All-Ireland Senior Ladies' Football Championship Final was the second All-Ireland Final and the deciding match of the 1975 All-Ireland Senior Ladies' Football Championship, an inter-county ladies' Gaelic football tournament for the top teams in Ireland.

Tipperary retained the title with an easy win.

References

Ladies}
All-Ireland Senior Ladies' Football Championship Finals
Tipperary county ladies' football team matches
Galway county ladies' football team matches
All-Ireland